The W. Bailey House, also known as the Redstone Building, is a historic house in Eveleth, Minnesota, United States.  It was built 1905 using rusticated, rose-dyed concrete brick with matching stone trim.    The house was listed on the National Register of Historic Places in 1980 for its local significance in the theme of architecture.  It was nominated for being Eveleth's leading example of Queen Anne architecture.

See also
 National Register of Historic Places listings in St. Louis County, Minnesota

References

1905 establishments in Minnesota
Houses completed in 1905
Houses in St. Louis County, Minnesota
Houses on the National Register of Historic Places in Minnesota
National Register of Historic Places in St. Louis County, Minnesota
Queen Anne architecture in Minnesota